The Port of Wahran or Port of Oran is an Algerian port in the west of the country and exactly in the city of Oran, overlooking the Mediterranean Sea and is considered one of the important ports in each of the fields of trade and marine transportation.

Transport in Oran
Wahran
Buildings and structures in Oran
Ports and harbours of the Arab League
Transport in the Arab League